The Powder Cellar Museum is a museum in the city of Azov, Rostov Oblast, Russia. It is a branch of the Azov Museum of History, Archaeology and Palaeontology. The place it occupies was recognized as a cultural monument of federal significance of Russian Federation.

History 
The first powder cellar in Azov, a wooden building for the storage of gunpowder, was built in 1770. Inside the cellar were made bunks, where barrels of gunpowder were kept. The wooden cellar was disassembled in 1797 after falling into a dilapidated state.

On the site of the wooden cellar in the bastion of St. Anna in 1799 a brick cellar was built according to the design of engineer Antonia de Laval. The height of the cellar with double walls of one-and-a-half-meter thick was 12 meters, depth ― 5 meters, capacity ― 60 tons. The upper arch of the building was interspersed with resin and clay in three layers. Such a construction provided amortization in the explosion, which could occur when the cellar would be hit with a shell.

In Azov Fortress there were built four powder cellars. They were situated in the Bastion of St. Peter, in the Polugarny Bastion, near the Alekseevsky Gate, and in the Bastion of St. Anna. The first three cellars have not survived to date. The powder cellar in the bastion of St. Anna in 1806 was rebuilt into artillery arsenal.

Since 1810, Azov Fortress has gradually declined. In the 19th century, the cellar was covered with earth up to the roof.

In the nineteenth and early twentieth centuries the powder cellar was used to store ice and other goods in summer.

The Powder Cellar Museum was opened in Azov in 1967. The historical diorama of artist Arseniy Chernyshov "The capture of the Turkish fortress of Azov by the troops of Peter I in 1696" is open at the museum's exposition. There is also an exhibition of structures for the storage of artillery arsenal and materials on the history of firearms.

In the courtyard of the museum there is a model of a mound with Cuman stone statues are erected, near the building there is a Russian cannon which was cast at the end of the 17th century. A monument to Alexander Suvorov is located in the grounds of the museum.

Gallery

External links 
 Places of interest in Azov
 Official site of Azov History, Archaeology and Paleontology Museum-Reserve
 An article about the Powder Cellar

References 

Museums established in 1967
Museums in Rostov Oblast
Cultural heritage monuments of federal significance in Rostov Oblast